The 1983 WTA German Open, also known by its sponsored name Fila German Open, was a women's tennis tournament played on outdoor clay courts at the Rot-Weiss Tennis Club in West Berlin in West Germany that was part of the 1983 Virginia Slims World Championship Series. The tournament was held from 16 May through 22 May 1983. First-seeded Chris Evert-Lloyd won the singles title and earned $27,500 first-prize money.

Finals

Singles
 Chris Evert-Lloyd defeated  Kathleen Horvath 6–4, 7–6(7–1)
 It was Evert-Lloyd's 3rd singles title of the year and the 123rd of her career.

Doubles
 Jo Durie /  Anne Hobbs defeated  Claudia Kohde-Kilsch /  Eva Pfaff 6–4, 7–6(7–2)
 It was Durie's 2nd title of the year and the 3rd of her career. It was Hobbs' 2nd title of the year and the 3rd of her career.

Prize money

References

External links
 ITF tournament edition details

 
WTA German Open
WTA German Open
May 1983 sports events in Europe
1983 in German tennis